Jinfeng is a town under the administration of Fucheng District, Mianyang, Sichuan, China. , it has one residential community and 8 villages under its administration.

References 

Township-level divisions of Sichuan
Mianyang